The Nikon E series, co-developed with Fujifilm, are autofocus 1.3 megapixel professional grade quasi-full frame (35mm) Nikon F-mount digital single lens reflex cameras (DSLR) manufactured by Nikon since 1995.

The E series included the Nikon E2/E2S,  Nikon E2N/E2NS  and the Nikon E3/E3S. The S-variants are identical except they had triple the frame rate and a larger buffer.

Its unique optical system bundles the light of the full-frame lenses to the small 2/3 inch CCD sensor. That gives approximately 4 stops more light at the small sensor, therefore delivering an exceptional (for that time) minimum sensitivity of 800 and maximum 3200 ISO, which remains usable for press and news use.

Technology

The Nikon E2/E2S and E2N/E2NS use a Nikon F4 subsystem, the E3/E3S uses a Nikon F100 subsystem.

Optical system
The E series uses a unique additional optical system that enables the small sensor to capture the field of view of a 35mm film, with a crop factor of 1. This comes not at the expense of the F-stop of the lenses, because the light is bundled to the  inch CCD sensor with approximately 16 times smaller area. The result is approximately 4 stops (24 = 16) more light at the small sensor compared to a full-frame sensor. Therefore, the camera has a minimum full-frame sensitivity of ISO 800 which is equivalent to ISO 50 at  inch. As a result, the noise of the camera at ISO 800 full-frame is equivalent to ISO 50 of the  inch CCD sensor. Nikon could not reduce sensitivity below 800 ISO full-frame, because the little sensor will be overexposed below 50 ISO.

The exceptional high sensitivity up to 3200 ISO (equivalent 200 ISO,  inch) can be seen as an advantage for indoor or available light photography and is important for professional press and sports use, the customer target area.

Although the camera is small for a 90s DSLR, the additional optical system makes the camera deeper compared to today's DSLRs.

Standard Nikon F-mount lenses can be used.

Storage and replay
A PCMCIA compatible memory card is used. Images are digitally stored as uncompressed TIFF or compressed JPEG. It can be accessed via a SCSI connector. TV replay (NTSC or PAL) is possible.

Variants

History
Nikon gained knowledge on digital cameras (still video cameras, with analog storage) by constructing the Nikon Still Video Camera (SVC) Model 1, a prototype which was first presented at photokina 1986. The follower Nikon QV-1000C Still Video Camera was produced since 1988 mainly for professional press use. Both cameras used QV mount lenses, a variant of F-mount lenses. Via an adapter (QM-100) other Nikkor lenses can be fitted.

The Nikon NASA F4 was one of the first cameras with digital storage. Eastman Kodak used Nikon SLR's to design the Kodak DCS 100 and followers.

Nikon E2/E2S

This first variant was manufactured since 1995 and were also available as Fujifilm Fujix DS-505 and DS-515.

Nikon E2N/E2NS
Announced 1996. Also available as Fujifilm Fujix DS-505A and DS-515A.

Nikon E3/E3S
The Nikon E3 and Nikon E3S, co-developed with Fujifilm and marketed also as the Fujix DS-560 and Fujix DS-565, are autofocus 1.3 megapixel professional grade quasi-full frame (35mm) digital single lens reflex cameras (DSLR) announced by the Nikon Corporation on 15 June 1998 and released in December 1999. The E3S is identical to the E3 except triple frame rate and larger buffer. They are followers of the Nikon E2N/E2NS.

See also
Nikon NASA F4
Minolta RD-175
Telecompressor

References

E series
E series